Dmytro Kostyantynovych Semenov (born 4 November 1999) is a Ukrainian football player who plays for Kryvbas Kryvyi Rih.

Club career
He made his Ukrainian Second League debut for Dnipro on 15 July 2017 in a game against Real Pharma Odesa.

References

External links
 
 

1999 births
Footballers from Dnipro
Living people
Ukrainian footballers
Association football defenders
FC Dnipro players
FC Oleksandriya players
MFC Mykolaiv players
FK Jelgava players
FC Kremin Kremenchuk players
FC Kryvbas Kryvyi Rih players
Ukrainian First League players
Ukrainian Second League players
Latvian Higher League players
Ukrainian expatriate footballers
Expatriate footballers in Latvia
Ukrainian expatriate sportspeople in Latvia